Kazimierz Wichniarz (18 January 1915 in Posen(now Poznan) - 26 June 1995 in Warsaw) was a Polish film and theatre actor. In 1974 he starred in the Academy Award-nominated film The Deluge under Jerzy Hoffman.

He is interred at the Powązki Military Cemetery in Warsaw.

Selected filmography
 Szatan z siódmej klasy (1960)
 Godzina pąsowej róży (1963)
 Małżeństwo z rozsądku (1966)
 The Peasans (Chłopi, 1972) TV series
 The Peasants (Chłopi, 1973)
 Hubal (1973)
 The Deluge (Potop, 1974)
 The Promised Land (Ziemia obiecana, 1974)
 Zamach stanu (1981)

Honours and awards
 Commander's Cross of the Order of Polonia Restituta (1984); previously awarded the Officer's Cross (1975) and the Knight's Cross (1967)
 Gold Cross of Merit (1956)
 Medal of the 10th anniversary of the Polish People's Republic (1955)
 Medal of the 40th anniversary of the Polish People's Republic (1984)
 Badge of Merit in Culture (1975)
 Gold Badge of Trade Unions (1975)
 Badge "For merits for Warsaw" (1967)
 Prize of the City of Warsaw (1980)

References

External links
 

Polish male film actors
Polish male stage actors
1915 births
1995 deaths
Commanders of the Order of Polonia Restituta
Recipients of the Gold Cross of Merit (Poland)
Burials at Powązki Military Cemetery
20th-century Polish male actors
Recipient of the Meritorious Activist of Culture badge